Tessmannianthus cereifolius is a species of plant in the family Melastomataceae. It is endemic to Panama.

References

Endemic flora of Panama
cereifolius
Data deficient plants
Taxonomy articles created by Polbot